Chrysler Detroit Axle Plant (AKA Eldon Axle) was a Chrysler automobile factory in Detroit, Michigan.  The factory opened in 1917 and was purchased by Chrysler in 1928.  It was expanded in 1956, 1964, 1966, 1969, 1998, 2000, and 2001.  The factory closed in 2010.  The plant has since been demolished. The property is now used to store new vehicles waiting to be shipped to dealerships.  

Products:
 Rear drive axles
 Dodge Dakota
 Dodge Durango
 Dodge Ram
 Jeep Grand Cherokee
 Jeep Commander
 Front drive axles
 Dodge Ram
 Dodge Dakota
 Dodge Durango
 Jeep Grand Cherokee
 Jeep Commander
 Trailing axles
 Dodge and Chrysler Minivans
 Differentials
 Chrysler 300
 Dodge Magnum
 Dodge Charger

External links
 Detroit Axle Closing

Chrysler factories
Industrial buildings and structures in Detroit
Motor vehicle assembly plants in Michigan
1917 establishments in Michigan